Babington Academy (formerly Babington Community College) is an 11–16 mixed secondary school with academy status in Beaumont Leys, Leicester, Leicestershire, England. It is part of the Learning without Limits Academy Trust.

The school relocated to a new building on the same site in September 2014.

Notable alumni 
Babington Community College
 Gok Wan, fashion consultant, author and television presenter

References

External links 
 

Secondary schools in Leicester
Academies in Leicester